The Federal Prison Camp, Montgomery (FPC Montgomery) is a minimum-security United States federal prison for male inmates in Montgomery, Alabama. It is operated by the Federal Bureau of Prisons, a division of the United States Department of Justice.

FPC Montgomery is located on the grounds of Maxwell Air Force Base, in northwest Montgomery, Alabama.

Notable inmates

†Inmates who were released from custody prior to 1982 are not listed on the Bureau of Prisons website.

See also

List of U.S. federal prisons
Federal Bureau of Prisons
Incarceration in the United States

References

External links
FPC Montgomery via Federal Bureau of Prisons

Buildings and structures in Montgomery, Alabama
Montgomery
Prisons in Alabama